The College of Commerce (CNCCU) at National Chengchi University (NCCU) was established in 1958.
The College of Commerce is regarded nationally as one of the best business schools in Taiwan, and CNCCU has a wide range of business accreditation reviews which is comparable to top business schools in the world, such as KAIST College of Business, the Secretariat of AAPBS. CNCCU is often viewed as the flagship faculty (including the impact of Alumni networking) of National Chengchi University. According to Eduniversal's official selection, CNCCU is a "TOP Business School". There are 8 departments, 1 graduate institute, and 16 research centers in the college.

Special programs

MBA programs 
The College of Commerce teaches several MBA programs, each with a distinct focus on management education in Taiwan:
MBA Program
International MBA (IMBA)
EMBA

International Exchange Program (IEP) 
The International Exchange Programs at College of Commerce in NCCU was set forth in 1999 with the aim of providing incoming international students from its partner schools with the opportunities to acquire direct exposure and training within an Asian context and to nurture the aspiration in our domestic students. There are currently about 100 exchange students from over 60 top business schools in the world and about 200 international students from over 30 different countries in College of Commerce in NCCU.

English Taught Program (ETP) 
ETP Program is a special program which aims to train local students' English as well as their professional ability in management. It found in 2000, and accepted freshman only after examination every September.

PhD Programs 
The College of Commerce offers English Taught PhD courses joint offered by college's 8 Departments & 1 Graduate Institute 
PhD Programs

Accreditations 
National Chengchi University is the first university in Taiwan earned two international accreditation of college of commerce.

AACSB 
On 20 December 2006, National Chengchi University earned international accreditation of AACSB International (The Association to Advance Collegiate Schools of Business) for its business school.

EQUIS
EQUIS (European Quality Improvement System) is an international programme for the assessment of European education in economic and business sciences. College of Commerce in National Chengchi University was awarded this international accreditation in April 2010.

Departments and institutes 
There are 9 departments and institutes in National Chengchi University College of Commerce as follows, and each department offer several different programs:

Dept. of International Business (BBA, MS, PhD)
Dept. of Money and Banking (BBA, MS, PhD)
Dept. of Accounting (BBA, MS, PhD)
Dept. of Statistics (BBS, MS, PhD)
Dept. of Business Administration (BBA, PhD, DBA)
Dept. of Management Information Systems (BBA, MS, PhD, DBA)
Dept. of Finance (BBA, MS, PhD)
Dept. of Risk Management & Insurance (BBA, MS, PhD)
Graduate Institute of Technology, Innovation & Intellectual Property Management (MS, PhD, DBA)

Partner schools
National Chengchi University College of Commerce has exchange partnerships with over 70 universities in five different continents. Each year, over 150 students go abroad on their exchange and the school welcomes over 150 incoming exchange students. Partner schools include as follows:

References

External links
Official website 
Official website 
NCCU official website 
NCCU official website 

Educational institutions established in 1957
Business schools in Taiwan
College of Commerce
1957 establishments in Taiwan